(also called pane toscano outside Tuscany) is a variety of bread commonly found in Tuscany, Umbria, and the Marches, three regions of Italy. Sciocco means "without salt", but is also a synonym for "stupid" in Italian.
Tu proverai sì come sa di sale lo pane altrui, ...

You will experience how salty is the others' bread, ...
Dante Alighieri from the Divine Comedy

Saltless
Being different from the other kinds of Italian bread, pane sciocco does not have any salt added. According to legend, bakers created a saltless bread so they did not have to pay an increased salt tax.

Pane Sciocco is often eaten with Tuscan condiments like Pecorino Toscano cheese, ham, sausages, and prosciutto.

References

See also
Tuscan cuisine

Italian breads